Richard Edward Fenton-Smith (19 October 1931 – 11 April 2021) was an Australian rules footballer who played for Melbourne in the Victorian Football League (VFL) during the late 1950s.

Prior to starting with Melbourne Fenton-Smith played with the 1954 QANFL premiership Western Districts team.

Recruited from Ormond Amateur Football Club, Fenton-Smith played in many positions in his brief career including the ruck and defence. He kicked 18 of his 21 goals in his debut season and played in two Melbourne premiership teams. In 1960 he moved to Adelaide and played with Sturt in the South Australian National Football League.

See also
 Australian football at the 1956 Summer Olympics

References

External links

1931 births
Australian rules footballers from Victoria (Australia)
Melbourne Football Club players
Western Magpies Australian Football Club players
Ormond Amateur Football Club players
2021 deaths
Australian footballers at the 1956 Summer Olympics
Sturt Football Club players
Melbourne Football Club Premiership players
Two-time VFL/AFL Premiership players